Naoko Kijimuta and Nana Miyagi were the defending champions but did not compete that year.

Virginia Ruano Pascual and Paola Suárez won in the final 7–6, 6–3 against Julie Halard-Decugis and Janette Husárová.

Seeds
Champion seeds are indicated in bold text while text in italics indicates the round in which those seeds were eliminated.

 Florencia Labat /  Elena Likhovtseva (quarterfinals)
 Eva Melicharová /  Helena Vildová (first round)
 Sung-Hee Park /  Shi-Ting Wang (semifinals)
 Silvia Farina /  Barbara Schett (first round)

Draw

External links
 1998 ANZ Tasmanian International Doubles Draw

Hobart International – Doubles
Doubles